The 2017–18 Arkansas Razorbacks women's basketball team represented the University of Arkansas in the 2017-18 NCAA Division I women's basketball season. They were led by new coach and Arkansas native Mike Neighbors, who was hired from Washington after former coach Jimmy Dykes resigned after three seasons. They finished the season 13–18, 3–13 in SEC play to finish in a 3 way for eleventh place. They advanced to the second round of the SEC women's tournament where they lost to Texas A&M.

Roster

Schedule
Source:

|-
!colspan=9 style=| Exhibition

|-
!colspan=9 style=| Non-conference regular season

|-
!colspan=9 style=| SEC regular season

|-
!colspan=9 style=| SEC Women's Tournament

See also
2017–18 Arkansas Razorbacks men's basketball team

References

Arkansas
Arkansas Razorbacks women's basketball seasons
Arkansas Razor
Arkansas Razor